Leptolejeunea is a genus of liverwort in family Lejeuneaceae. It contains the following species (but this list may be incomplete):
 Leptolejeunea tridentata Bischl.
 Leptolejeunea elliptica  (Lehm. & Lindenb.) Schiffn.

References 

Porellales genera
Lejeuneaceae
Taxonomy articles created by Polbot